The 2019 NAB AFL Under-18 Championships was the 24th edition of the AFL Under-18 Championships. 

The tournament was played between five teams—Allies, South Australia, Vic Country, Vic Metro and Western Australia—playing each other across five rounds.

Western Australia won the tournament for the first time since 2009, Western Australia captain and midfielder Deven Robertson won the Larke Medal as the tournament's best player.

Fixture

All-Australian team
The 2019 All-Australian team

References

Under-18